The Damon Runyon Cancer Research Foundation (Damon Runyon) is an American not-for-profit cancer research organization focused on "discovering the talent to discover the cure". The organization states that its goals are to: "identify the best and brightest early career scientists in cancer research, accelerate the translation of scientific discoveries into new diagnostic tools and treatments, and to enable risk-taking on bold new ideas".

The organization was founded in 1946 by media personality Walter Winchell in New York City, New York, under the name Damon Runyon Cancer Memorial Fund in memory of his colleague and friend Damon Runyon, a newspaperman and author.

History
Almost immediately after Runyon's passing on December 10, 1946, Winchell went on the air and asked his audience for contributions to cancer research:  
Mr. and Mrs. United States!  A very dear friend of mine a great newspaperman, a great writer, and a very great guy Damon Runyon, was killed this week by America's Number Two killer Cancer.  It's time we tried to do something to fight this terrible disease.  We must fight back, and together we can do it.  Won't you send me a penny, a nickel, a dime, or a dollar?  All of your money will go directly to the cancer fighters, in Damon Runyon's name.  There will be no expenses of any kind deducted.
The organization gained more visibility in 1949 when Milton Berle, a long-time friend of both Runyon and Winchell, hosted the first-ever telethon, raising $1.1 million for the foundation over 16 hours.  In its first three decades, the foundation was a popular cause among celebrities from Hollywood to Broadway and the sports world. Marlene Dietrich, Bob Hope, Marilyn Monroe, Joe DiMaggio, and many of their contemporaries served as supporters and board members.

Award programs and research
The organization manages six award programs "aimed at encouraging and advancing the work of early career cancer researchers with high promise".  The Fellowship Award is the oldest and most widely known in the scientific community, giving postdoctoral researchers between $200,000 and $250,000 over four years.  Other programs include the Damon Runyon-Sohn Pediatric Cancer Fellowship Award, the Damon Runyon Clinical Investigator Award and the Damon Runyon-Rachleff Innovation Award. The foundation launched in 2020 the Damon Runyon Quantitative Biology Fellowship to bridge quantitative approaches to cancer research.

The foundation has funded twelve Nobel Prize laureates, including Albert Szent-Györgyi, Salvador E. Luria, Susumu Tonegawa and Sidney Altman.  Sixty-five foundation scientists and alumni have been elected to the U.S. National Academy of Sciences.

Evaluations
Charity Navigator rates the foundation four of four stars, indicating the organization "exceeds industry standards and outperforms most charities in its Cause". According to the Better Business Bureau, the foundation met the twenty standards for charity accountability as of 2011.  A timeline listing of specific accomplishments and milestones by foundation scientists is available on the foundation's website.

Famous donors 
 New York mobster Benjamin "Bugsy" Siegel was a major donor for the Los Angeles-Las Vegas branches.

References

External links
 Guidestar Report on the Damon Runyon Cancer Research Foundation including financial data
 Charity Navigator's Rating of the Damon Runyon Cancer Research Foundation

1946 establishments in New York City
Cancer charities in the United States
Charities based in New York City
Financial District, Manhattan
Non-profit organizations based in New York City
Organizations established in 1946
Medical and health organizations based in New York (state)